The University of New Zealand was New Zealand's sole degree-granting university from 1874 to 1961. It was a collegiate university embracing several constituent institutions at various locations around New Zealand. 

After the University of New Zealand was dissolved in 1961, its constituent colleges became four independent degree-granting universities and two associated agricultural colleges: the University of Otago (Dunedin), University of Canterbury (Christchurch), University of Auckland (Auckland), Victoria University of Wellington (Wellington), Canterbury Agricultural College (Lincoln) and Massey Agricultural College (Palmerston North).

History
The University of New Zealand Act set up the university in 1870. At that time, the system's headquarters was in Christchurch, Canterbury Province.

The University of Otago negotiated to keep its title of "university" when it joined the University of New Zealand in 1874, but it agreed to award degrees of the University of New Zealand. The colleges in Christchurch, Auckland and Wellington were known as "university colleges" rather than "universities" throughout most of the history of the University of New Zealand.

The Universities Act of 1961 dissolved the university and granted degree-conferring powers to the former constituent colleges. The New Zealand Vice-Chancellors' Committee assumed certain administrative functions exercised by the University Grants Committee which in turn assumed some functions of the University of New Zealand on its demise.

Entrance to the university
The university set its own entrance examination and awarded scholarships to provide financial assistance for students. When the university was dissolved matters concerning entrance to New Zealand universities became the responsibility of the Universities Entrance Board, a subcommittee of the University Grants Committee. The Universities Entrance Board was in turn merged into the New Zealand Qualifications Authority in 1990.

Other use of the name
Te Wānanga o Aotearoa, founded in 1984, used "The University of New Zealand" as an English translation of its name, although it had no connection with the former university. After objections from bodies such as the New Zealand Vice-Chancellors' Committee (the heads of the universities) and the Ministry of Education over illegal use of a protected word (in this case, "university") and thus possibly misleading advertising, the effective co-branding of the wānanga was phased out. The institution is now formally registered as a wānanga, one of five types of Crown-owned tertiary institutions under New Zealand law, the others being universities, colleges of education, specialist colleges and polytechnics.

Alumni

See also 
 List of honorary doctors of the University of New Zealand
 Tertiary education in New Zealand
 University system (for other federations or unions of universities across the world)
 List of split up universities

References

Further reading
Alphabetical Roll of Graduates 1870-1961(Wellington: Whitcombe & Tombs, 1963) (List of Alumni) scanned PDF
The University of New Zealand: An Historical Study by J. C. Beaglehole (Wellington: New Zealand Council for Educational Research, Educational Research Series no. 3, 1937)
The University in New Zealand : Facts and Figures (G.A Currie & E.G. Kedgley, [1960].)

External links
New Zealand Vice-Chancellors' Committee
The New Zealand University (1885 article)

 
Universities in New Zealand
Educational institutions established in 1870
Educational institutions disestablished in 1961
Defunct universities and colleges in New Zealand
1870 establishments in New Zealand
1961 disestablishments in New Zealand